Pyrrhichos (Greek: Πυρῥιχος) in Greek mythology is the god of the rustic dance. When translated literally, Pyrrhichos translates into "rustic war dance".

See also
 List of Greek mythological figures

References

Greek gods
Arts gods